Niall Brassil (born 25 March 1999) is an Irish hurler who plays for Kilkenny Senior Championship club James Stephens and at inter-county level with the Kilkenny senior hurling team. He usually lines out as a left corner-forward.

Honours

James Stephens
Kilkenny Senior Hurling League (1): 2018

Kilkenny
Leinster Under-20 Hurling Championship (1): 2019
Leinster Minor Hurling Championship (1): 2017

References

1999 births
Living people
James Stephens hurlers
Kilkenny inter-county hurlers